Telugu Mahila is the Women's Wing of the Telugu Desam Party.

Former presidents

United Andhrapradesh
Jaya Prada
Nannapaneni Rajakumari
Roja
Shobha haymavathi

Andhrapradesh

 Vangalapudi Anitha

Telangana
Bandru Shobharani.
 Jyothsna Tirunagari

References

Telugu Desam Party
Women's wings of political parties in India
Year of establishment missing